The French submarine Aréthuse was one of eight s built for the French Navy during the 1910s and completed during World War I.

See also 
List of submarines of France

Notes

Bibliography

 

Amphitrite-class submarines
1916 ships
Ships built in France